Rocallarga is a mountain of the Guilleries Massif, Catalonia, Spain.

See also
 Mountains of Catalonia

References

Mountains of Catalonia